The women's shot put event at the 1972 European Athletics Indoor Championships was held on 11 March in Grenoble.

Results

References

Shot put at the European Athletics Indoor Championships
Shot